Orgel is the debut extended play of South Korean singer, Sungmin. The album released on November 22, 2019, under Label SJ, and was distributed by SM Entertainment and Dreamus. "Orgel" served as the album's lead single.

Background and release
On July 6, 2017, Sungmin announced that he would be taking a hiatus from Super Junior due to fan boycotts regarding his marriage in 2014. Sungmin remained on hiatus from musical activities and Super Junior throughout 2018 and most of 2019, with his only solo release being "Daydream," via SM Station on March 2, 2018.

On November 3, 2019, Label SJ announced that Sungmin would be returning to make his solo debut in mid-November, marking his first official musical activity since Super Junior's Mamacita in 2014. On November 10, 2019, SM tweeted that Sungmin's mini-album would be titled "Orgel," with 5 tracks and a release date of November 22 at 6 PM KST. The album's tracklist was revealed on November 14 and a highlight medley was released on November 19. The album and its music video released on November 22.

Reception
Orgel peaked at #44 on the GAON Album Chart on its first week. The EP also sold 6,182 copies in Korea. Internationally, EP ranked #1 in iTunes top album chart in 11 countries.

Track listing
All credits adapted from artist page.

References

2019 EPs
EPs by South Korean artists
Korean-language EPs
SM Entertainment EPs